Emdin is a settlement in Kenya's Rift Valley Province located just off the Kenyan C36 route.

References 

Populated places in Nandi County